Samuel Cunningham House, also known as Pleasant View Farm, is a historic home located near Hedgesville, Berkeley County, West Virginia. It was built in 1820 and is a two-story, eight bay, gable roofed stone and brick house.  The house was expanded about 1840 and a Colonial Revival style porch was added in the early 20th century.  Also on the property is a brick smoke house.

It was listed on the National Register of Historic Places in 1976.

References

Houses on the National Register of Historic Places in West Virginia
Houses completed in 1820
Houses in Berkeley County, West Virginia
National Register of Historic Places in Berkeley County, West Virginia
Georgian architecture in West Virginia
Vernacular architecture in West Virginia
Colonial Revival architecture in West Virginia
Stone houses in West Virginia